"Houston Solution" is a song written by Paul Overstreet and Don Schlitz, and recorded by American country music artist Ronnie Milsap.  It was released in April 1989 as the second single from the album Stranger Things Have Happened.  The song reached #4 on the Billboard Hot Country Singles & Tracks chart.

Chart performance

Year-end charts

References

1989 singles
Ronnie Milsap songs
Songs written by Paul Overstreet
Songs written by Don Schlitz
Song recordings produced by Tom Collins (record producer)
RCA Records singles
1989 songs